Joseph W. Begala (March 4, 1906 – April 24, 1978) was an American college football and collegiate wrestling coach. He served as the head football coach at Kent State University in Kent, Ohio from 1933 to 1934, compiling a record of 4–5–6. He also served as Kent State's wrestling coach, amassing a dual match record of 307–69–5. Begala died on April 24, 1978, at Robinson Memorial Hospital in Ravenna, Ohio.

Head coaching record

Football

References

External links
 

1906 births
1978 deaths
Kent State Golden Flashes football coaches
College wrestling coaches in the United States
Ohio University alumni
People from Struthers, Ohio